John Keister (born 1 January 1988 in Freetown, Sierra Leone) Is a Sierra Leonean footballer. He is an offensive midfielder and plays for PK-37 in the Finnish third tier of football, Kakkonen.

Keister was a member of Sierra Leone U-17 squad at the 2003 FIFA U-17 World Championship in Finland.

External links

 

1988 births
Living people
Sierra Leonean footballers
Sierra Leone international footballers
Sierra Leonean expatriate footballers
Expatriate footballers in Finland
Veikkausliiga players
Pallo-Kerho 37 players
Helsingin Jalkapalloklubi players

Association football forwards